The Hymno Patriótico was considered Portugal’s first national anthem. Marcos Portugal, who had remained living in Portugal, had, in 1808, initially named the piece as ‘the Prince’s Hymn’ (D. João VI Hymn). With this dedication, it was offered to the prince regent D. John and first performed for him in Brazil in 1809. The anthem was inspired by the cantata "La Speranza o sia l’Augurio Felice". The lyrics changed several times, altered by contemporary events, until settling into a more or less permanent form in 1821. 

It was a particularly popular tune with the Portuguese troops of Wellington's Peninsular Army, where it was known by the words from the chorus Vencer ou morrer ("Win or die"). Wellington's Advocate General, Seymour Larpent, noted in his diary on 9 June 1813, "The Portuguese are in the highest order, the men really look at least equal to ours, better than some … the infantry and the Caçadores in particular. The whole army marches very fresh hitherto, but the Portuguese in particular; they come in, even to the last mile, singing along the road." "I have heard it boldly played in the teeth of the enemy by the Portuguese bands … It made all Portuguese hearts pant for the fight … and as the voices joined the music, Vencer o morir [Vencer ou morrer] was not sung without meaning."

After D. Peter of Braganza became king and provided a new constitution, the song "Hymno da Carta" became more commonly used as the anthem, and the latter was officially decreed as such in 1834.

Lyrics

See also
Hymno da Carta
A Portuguesa

Notes

References
 The private journal of F. Seymour Larpent, during the Peninsular War, from 1812 to its close (1853)

External links
 Music Sheet (Page 1) 
 Music Sheet (Page 2) 
 Music Sheet (Page 3) 
 Music of the Allies from the Peninsula to Waterloo 

Historical national anthems
Kingdom of Portugal
Portuguese anthems
Royal anthems
Portuguese-language songs
National anthem compositions in E-flat major
Portuguese patriotic songs